Adel Saqr (Arabic:عادل صقر) (born 16 March 1986) is an Emirati footballer. He currently plays as a midfielder for Al Bataeh .

Career
He formerly played for Al-Ahli, Ajman, Al-Sharjah, Emirates Club, Ittihad Kalba, Al-Wahda, Al Dhaid, Al-Shaab, Masfout, Dibba Al-Hisn, Khor Fakkan, and Al Bataeh.

External links

References

1986 births
Living people
Emirati footballers
Al Ahli Club (Dubai) players
Ajman Club players
Sharjah FC players
Emirates Club players
Al-Ittihad Kalba SC players
Al Wahda FC players
Al Dhaid SC players
Al-Shaab CSC players
Masfout Club players
Dibba Al-Hisn Sports Club players
Khor Fakkan Sports Club players
Al Bataeh Club players
UAE Pro League players
UAE First Division League players
Association football wingers
Place of birth missing (living people)
Footballers at the 2006 Asian Games
Asian Games competitors for the United Arab Emirates